Madatha Kaja is a 2011 Indian Telugu-language romantic comedy film written and directed by Seetaramaraju Dantuluri, produced by Vedarajuu Timber under Timbuu Productions and Sri Ranjith Movies banners and starring Allari Naresh and Sneha Ullal in lead roles. The film soundtrack was composed by Sri Vasant and Cinematography was handled by Adusumilli Vijay Kumar. Dialogues of the film were written by popular writer Satish Vegesna and screenplay was handled also by Satish Vegesna and Seetaramaraju Dantuluri. This film marks the debut of Seetaramaraju Dantuluri as a director. Madata Kaja was released on 29 September 2011.
The film was later dubbed in Hindi as Mera Pyaar in 2018.

Plot
Kalyan (Allari Naresh) is a happy going guy who works as police informer in Vizag. He reports to a local cop, Sai Kumar (Dharmavarapu Subramanyam). He falls for Swapna (Sneha Ullal) and it is love at first sight for him. Swapna is the daughter of KP (Ahuti Prasad). Kalyan’s friend Kishore (Vennela Kishore) and cop Sai Kumar helps him in gaining Sneha’s love. Meanwhile, the cops ask Kalyan to come to Hyderabad to gather information on two mafia leaders JP (Jaya Prakash Reddy) and KP (Ahuti Prasad). KP takes care of international Don Nanda’s (Ashish Vidyarthi) illegal business along with JP. JP and KP always fight with each other which bring losses to Nanda. To make them unite Nanda sketches a plan. He passes an order JP’s son should marry KP’s daughter. While in the process of helping the Police with the investigation, he then finds out that Swapna is the daughter of KP. With her help, Kalyan is on a mission to get all the information he can on these criminals and their mafia boss in Bangkok, Nanda. Meanwhile, Swapna's marriage is fixed to JP's son Ajay (Subbaraju). He starts playing mind games with the mafia leaders. Kalyan's battle against all these odds will eventually help him bring Nanda to the justice and also win over his love.

Cast 
 Allari Naresh as Kalyan
 Sneha Ullal as Swapna
 Maryam Zakaria as Priya
 Ashish Vidyarthi as Nanda
 Ali as Akuvakala Lingaraju/Ali
 Subbaraju as Ajay
 Dharmavarapu Subramanyam as Sai Kumar
 M. S. Narayana
 Ahuti Prasad as KP
 Jaya Prakash Reddy as JP
 Jeeva as Dasu
 Raghu Babu as Puli
 Vennela Kishore as Kishore
 Chalapathi Rao as Vizag Police Commissioner
 Brahmanandam as Padmasri
 Thagubothu Ramesh
 Kavitha

Production and casting
This film was the debut film for Seetaramaraju Dantuluri as a director. He worked for many years in the direction department for many films under prominent film directors. Although the director planned to make the film few years back with Allari Naresh, due to the actor's previous commitments the film was postponed. Director worked on the script for almost 2 years before starting the shooting in 2011. The film was delayed due to the Telugu film strike of 2011. This was Allari Naresh's third release in the year. Sneha Ullal was cast for the role of Swapna, daughter of a mafia leader. Being a comedy film, it features most of the Telugu comedians like Ali, Subbaraju, M. S. Narayana Dharmavarapu Subramanyam, Ahuti Prasad, Jaya Prakash Reddy, Jeeva, Raghu Babu, Vennela Kishore and Chalapathi Rao. Writer turned director Satish Vegesna assisted Seetaramaraju with the screenplay and dialogues. Shooting of the film began in April 2011 and was completed in August 2011 and the film was released in September 2011. Shooting was predominantly done in Vizag and Bangkok.

Release and reception
The film was released in India and Overseas on 29 September 2011. The film was received with mixed to negative reviews. Suresh Kavirayani of Times of India gave a decent 2.5 of 5 rating for the film and said the film was a time-pass watch. Mahesh from 123 Telugu gave a 2.75 of 5 rating for the film and commented that although Madatha Kaja had few decent laughs but there was a lot going against the film than in favour of it. The film fared relatively well at the box-office despite the negative reviews and was declared an average grosser.

Soundtrack

Audio release of the film was held on 16 September 2011 in Visakhapatnam. The audio was released and distributed by Aditya Music. The music of this film was composed by Sri Vasant. The audio was well received. Bhaskarabhatla Ravikumar penned 2 songs while Sirivennela Sitaramasastri and Surendra Krishna penned one song each.

References

External links 
 

2011 films
Indian romantic comedy films
2010s Telugu-language films
2011 romantic comedy films